The Anderkilla Shahi Jame Mosque is built on top of a high hill called Ander-Qila (meaning inner fort). It is said to have been the earliest Mughal building that has been established in the city of Chittagong.

History
The Persian inscriptions on the mosque reveal that the Subahdar of Bengal Shaista Khan built-in 1667. It is believed that the mosque was built by the eldest son of Shaista Khan, Buzurg Umed Khan. He was also the conqueror of Chittagong. But, his name is not cited on the inscription. This mosque was unused for a long time and in the year 1761, the British officials used it to store arms and ammunition. In 1853, the Muslim elites of Chittagong headed by Hamidullah approached the British Government and were successful in releasing the mosque for religious purposes in 1855. The repairs and extension works are continuing till to date

References

Mughal mosques
17th-century architecture
Mosques in Chittagong